Aelurillus v-insignitus is a species of jumping spiders.

Appearance
The male has v-shaped rows of hairs on its head and a pronounced white median stripe on its abdomen. The female is mottled brown.

Name
Insignitus is Latin for "signed", because of the white chevron on the back of the male spider, which is in the form of the letter "V". This letter was originally spelled one v above another V, which could also be interpreted as a double V or W, but usually is interpreted as "V".

Distribution
A. v-insignitus occurs in the Palaearctic. It is the only Aelurillus species that occurs in northwestern Europe.

References

External links

Photography of male and female
 Short animation of courtship dance

Salticidae
Spiders of Europe
Spiders described in 1757
Palearctic spiders
Taxa named by Carl Alexander Clerck